Pablo Fuente Aguirre (born 1973) is a Spanish economist, podcaster and science communicator. He is mainly known for his work as a usual collaborator to journalist Iker Jiménez in Mediaset España, in which El Mundo and other newspapers distinguished him for his informative work during the COVID-19 pandemic in Spain. He is the creator of the investigation podcast El Respeto, awarded as Podcast of the Year 2020 in Spain.

Career
Born in a family of Galician origins and fifth siblings, Fuente graduated in economic science from the Complutense University of Madrid, adding later a business management master in ESADE. His first jobs were as a business consultant, working for companies like PepsiCo, Energizer and Capital Riesgo both in Spain and abroad. However, its main interest was journalism and radio, which led him to follow the careers of popular hosts like Miguel Blanco Medrano and Iker Jiménez. In 2015, while living in both Belgium and Switzerland, Fuente created its investigative journalist podcast, El Respeto, on the iVoox platform.

Four years after the podcast's premiere, Fuente joined the staff of geopolitical communication program La mesa del coronel, presented by Ejército de Tierra Col. Pedro Baños and producer by Jiménez in Cuatro. He then added appearances in Cuarto Milenio and Milenio Live, both of them also produced and directed by Jiménez.

In March 2020, Cuarto Milenio drew the attention of Spanish media due to a series of reportages about the COVID-19 pandemic, the main of them produced in February, whose guest experts accurately predicted the subsequent national impact. Fuente's own participation in the program, in which he brought data of a lack of preparation by the Spanish government and then advised viewers to prepare for a crisis, became a viral video itself on national social media. It reached the point where it was notoriously retweeted by Inés García, presenter of competition television channel La Sexta. The success took a controversial turn when Fuente, who had joined the specialized program Horizonte: Informe Covid, started receiving frequent death threats, to the point he considered abandoning his work and was only dissuaded from doing so by Jiménez, who had to ensure security for him. The case, as revealed later by Fuente, was closed with the intervention of the National Police Corps and a series of arrests.

Awards
At the end of 2020, Fuente received the award to the Best Podcast of the Year by the Asociación de Escuchas de Podcasting, attracting 46% of the crowd's voting.

Professional activity

Television
 La mesa del coronel (2019), Cuatro.
 Cuarto Milenio (2019-2022), Cuatro.
 Horizonte (2020-2022), Telecinco and later Cuatro.
 Futura (2022-present), Cuatro.

Internet
 El Respeto (2015–present), iVoox.
 Milenio Live (2019-2021), YouTube and Mtmad.
 La Estirpe de los Libres (2020-2022), YouTube.

References

External links
 El Respeto website

1973 births
Spanish economists
Podcasters
Science communicators
Spanish television presenters
Living people